Bryopsis plumosa, sometimes known by the common names green algae or hen pen, is a type of green seaweed.

Taxonomy 
This species was originally described by William Hudson under the name Ulva plumosa.

Distribution
Bryopsis plumosa is found in the British Isles, Europe, the Mediterranean Sea and the Black Sea, Azores, Portugal, Spain, France, Norway, Faroes and Iceland, on the Atlantic coast of North America, west coast of Greenland, Jamaica, Canary Islands, Senegal, Ghana, Mauritania, South Africa, British Columbia to California, Australia, Japan and New Zealand.

Description
Bryopsis plumosa has distichous branches with a thallus that is small and erect, growing up to 10 cm long. It is coloured bright green and has a soft, silky texture. The branches arranged in two opposite rows.

Reproduction
The species is dioecious when fertile the male plants turn yellowish-green and the female plants are dark green.

Ecology
It can be found in intertidal pools.

Similar species
Bryopsis hypnoides  can be difficult to distinguish, the branches of B. hypnoides are arranged spirally or irregularly.

References

Bryopsidales